Plestiodon quadrilineatus, the Hong Kong skink or four-striped skink, is a species of lizard which is found in China,
Thailand, Cambodia, and Vietnam.

References

quadrilineatus
Reptiles described in 1853
Taxa named by Edward Blyth